Heyworth–Mason Industrial Building is a historic factory located in Peru, Clinton County, New York.  It was built in 1836, and is a three-story, seven bay, rectangular, sandstone building measuring 35 feet wide and 60 feet long.  It has a gable roof and interior end chimneys.  It originally housed a factory and later storage.  It was converted to apartments in the 1970s.

It was listed on the National Register of Historic Places in 2011.

References

Industrial buildings and structures on the National Register of Historic Places in New York (state)
Industrial buildings completed in 1836
Buildings and structures in Clinton County, New York
National Register of Historic Places in Clinton County, New York